The longlure frogfish (Antennarius multiocellatus) is a species of frogfish in the genus Antennarius found in the western Atlantic from Bermuda and the Bahamas, south along the coasts of Central and South America, to Brazil around warm shallow reefs with abundant sponge populations at depths less than 215 feet (66 m).

Characteristics 
A bottom dweller, it mimics surrounding sponges by varying its background hue to match that of the dominant sponge in the area. It also has multiple ocellii (eye-like markings) that look like the openings in a sponge. The frogfish uses its stalked pectoral fins and its pelvic fins to slowly "walk" across the bottom. Frogfishes have been observed inflating themselves by filling their stomachs with air or water. This is a solitary species found in small populations.  It is the most common frogfish species in the West Indies and harmless to humans.

Distinctive features 
A short, fat, globular species, it generally does not exceed 8 in (20 cm), though 5 in (13 cm) is seldom exceeded. Its skin is thick and covered in highly modified scales called dermal spicules. These spicules are prickly in appearance and resemble the warts of a toad. The frogfish has small eyes, a very large mouth that is directed upwards, and pectoral fins situated on stalks. The gill openings are very small and located behind the pectoral fins. The basic color of the longlure frogfish is highly variable, ranging from pale yellow to bright red or dark green to reddish brown. Black spots are scattered across the body no matter what the base color. Multiocellatus means "many eye-like spots" in Latin. It also has a phase where the body is completely black, except for the ends of the paired fins which are white, and for a pale area that resembles a saddle on the back. The second and third dorsal spines are separate from the others and covered in thick skin.

Reproduction 
A unique feature of the frogfish family is that the eggs are spawned encapsulated in a buoyant mass of mucus, referred to as an "egg raft". This structure may serve as a transport of moving a large number of eggs over a large geographical distances. Spawning can be dangerous for the frogfish due to the cannibalistic nature of the species. The male and female march across the bottom before spawning, with the female leading and the male close behind. His snout usually is in immediate contact with her vent. The female is bloated with eggs during this time, often swelling to twice her normal size. The pair will then make a dash to the surface and the egg mass bursts from the female. The frogfish may spawn several times over a few weeks.

Diet 
A voracious ambush predator, it feeds mainly on fishes, but also on crabs and mantis shrimp. The name "longlure" is refers to the elongated illicium which acts as a fishing lure. The illicium is the first spine of the dorsal fin, highly modified into a long rod with a lure (esca) at the end. In most species, the esca looks like potential prey, such as a worm, crustacean, or even a fish. The frogfish will lie in a sponge and wait for a fish to swim by. It will then wiggle the lure around to attract the prey. It is capable of swallowing a fish that is larger in size than itself. Like a recreational human angler, the frogfish will move to a different location if no fish are biting. The frogfish is reported to be the fastest animal alive. It can move and suck in prey at speeds as quickly as 0.006 seconds, so only high-speed film can catch the action.

References

External links

http://www.marinebio.com/species.asp?id=28
http://www.tolweb.org/Antennarius
http://www.flmnh.ufl.edu/fish/gallery/Descript/FrogFish.htm
 
aboutfishonline.com page on Antennarius multiocellatus
saltwaterfish.com page on Antennarius multiocellatus

longlure frogfish
Fish of the Western Atlantic
Fauna of Ascension Island
longlure frogfish